Sir Terence Allen Shone  (4 September 1894 – 29 October 1965) was a British diplomat who served as the United Kingdom's Minister to Syria and Lebanon from 1944, High Commissioner to India from 1946 and deputy Permanent Representative to the United Nations from 1948.

He was the son of Lieutenant-General Sir William Shone and Janet FitzGibbon, daughter of Gerald Fitzgibbon, Lord Justice of the Court of Appeal in  Ireland. He was educated at Winchester College and University College, Oxford.

References

1894 births
1965 deaths
People educated at Winchester College
Alumni of University College, Oxford
British Army personnel of World War I
Knights Commander of the Order of St Michael and St George
Members of HM Diplomatic Service
Ambassadors of the United Kingdom to Lebanon
Ambassadors of the United Kingdom to Syria
High Commissioners of the United Kingdom to India
20th-century British diplomats